Ali Jamal Al Haj (born 2 February 2001) is a Lebanese footballer who plays as a forward for  club Ahed and the Lebanon national team. He is a skillful and versatile player who can play in a variety of offensive positions.

In 2018, Al Haj became the first player born in the 21st century to score in the Lebanese top flight, as well as the first player to have scored in three Lebanese national divisions in a single season, scoring with the under-17, under-19, and senior sides of Nejmeh.

Club career

Nejmeh

2017–18: Debut season 
Coming through the youth system, Al Haj's first-team debut for Nejmeh came during the 2017–18 Lebanese Premier League season on 3 March 2018, as a starter away to Safa; he scored a goal from outside the box to help Nejmeh win 3–1. He became the youngest player to score in the league, beating the previous record set by his brother Youssef, as well as the only player to have scored at least a goal in three official national divisions in a single season, having scored 14 and 27 goals respectively in the U17 and U19 leagues.

Al Haj played seven matches in the league (two as a starter and five as a substitute) for a total of 181 minutes, scoring and assisting once. He also scored seven goals for the U17 team in the Lebanese Youth League Final 6 (21 in total), coming second in the League with the Nejmeh youth team. For his performances, Al Haj won the Lebanese Young Player of the Year award for the 2017–18 season.

In July 2018, it was reported that Al Haj had undergone a trial with Austrian Football Bundesliga side Admira Wacker, with a professional contract expected to be signed. However, the transfer fell through and Al Haj remained at Nejmeh.

2018–19: Lebanese Elite Cup win and AFC Cup debut 
Al Haj played in the 2018–19 Arab Club Champions Cup for Nejmeh, in which he scored the match winner during stoppage time against Al Faisaly of Saudi Arabia in the play-off round on 20 May 2018; the match ended 2–1 for his team. He also scored a goal against Salam Zgharta in the 2018 Lebanese Elite Cup, which he won after Nejmeh beat Akhaa Ahli Aley 1–0 in the final. On 2 December 2018, Al Haj won the Lebanon Football League U19 Championship with Nejmeh U19. In the Lebanese FA Cup round of 16, played on 29 January 2019, he scored a brace in a 6–0 win against Taqadom Anqoun. On 25 February 2019, Al Haj made his debut in the AFC Cup as a 77th-minute substitute against Al-Wehdat of Jordan in a 1–0 away defeat.

Al Haj ended his season with six appearances in the league and four in the AFC Cup, and scored two goals in the Lebanese FA Cup.

2019–20: Cancelled season 
Al Haj played two games for Nejmeh in the 2019–20 Lebanese Premier League; on 20 September 2019 he played against cross-city rivals Ansar, and on 27 September he played against Tadamon Sour, on both instances as a substitute. However, the league was cancelled due to financial and political issues in Lebanon and the COVID-19 pandemic.

Ahed 

On 13 June 2020, Al Haj signed for AFC Cup title-holders Ahed on a five-year contract in a free transfer deal. He made his debut on 4 October 2020, in the first matchday of the 2020–21 Lebanese Premier League; Ahed won 3–2, with Al Haj playing 76 minutes. He finished the season with 12 league games. On 27 May 2021, Al Haj assisted Nour Mansour's header through a corner kick, helping Ahed beat Al-Muharraq of Bahrain 2–1 in the 2021 AFC Cup group stage.

On 31 July 2021, Al Haj sustained an ACL injury during Ahed's 2021 Lebanese Elite Cup final game against his former team Nejmeh. He returned to action for Ahed in the first matchday of the 2022–23 season, against Akhaa Ahli Aley on 4 September 2022. He had played his previous league game 16 months prior, also against Akhaa, on 23 April 2021.

International career

Youth 
On 30 January 2019, Al Haj was called up for the Lebanon national under-23 team for a trial in view of the 2020 AFC U23 qualification, and was called up for the final 23 man squad on 15 March 2019. Al Haj played twice in the tournament, against the United Arab Emirates on 22 March and Maldives on 26 March, in both instances as a substitute.

Senior 
Al Haj was first called up to the Lebanon senior national team by coach Aleksandar Ilić for a training camp in Bnachii, Zgharta between 19 and 27 September 2022. He made his debut on 30 December 2022, starting in a friendly game against the United Arab Emirates in Dubai.

Style of play 
A skilled forward, Al Haj can play on the flanks as a winger on either side, as well as centrally, both behind the striker and as a centre-forward. He has been described has being more individually talented than his father, Jamal, who also played as a footballer at Nejmeh and the Lebanon national team.

Personal life
Al Haj's father and agent, Jamal, captained and managed Nejmeh, while his older brother, Youssef, also plays football. In 2020, Al Haj was cited by Lebanon national team captain Hassan Maatouk as the most promising talent in Lebanon.

Honours
Nejmeh
 Lebanese Elite Cup: 2018
 Lebanese Premier League U19: 2018–19

Individual
 Lebanese Young Player of the Year: 2017–18

Records
 First player born in the 21st century to score in the Lebanese Premier League
 First player to score in three Lebanese national divisions in a single season (U17, U19, and senior)

Career statistics

International

See also 
 List of association football families

References

External links 

 
 

2001 births
Living people
Footballers from Beirut
Association football forwards
Lebanese footballers
Nejmeh SC players
Al Ahed FC players
Lebanese Premier League players
Lebanon youth international footballers
Lebanon international footballers